Hamlet is an unincorporated community northwest of McGregor, Williams County, North Dakota, United States. Today there are only a handful of residents, some grain elevators, and the remains of the public school.

Unincorporated communities in Williams County, North Dakota
Unincorporated communities in North Dakota